Arensburg may refer to:

 German name of Kuressaare, a town and a municipality on Saaremaa island in Estonia
 Schutzmannschaft Front Bataillon 36 Arensburg
 Baruch Arensburg (born 1934, Santiago, Chile), anatomist

See also
 Ahrensburg, a town in the district of Stormarn, Schleswig-Holstein, Germany